The Marlow-Hunter 50 is an American sailboat that was designed by the Hunter Design Team as a cruiser and first built in 2010.

The design was originally marketed by Hunter Marine as the Hunter 50 AC (for Aft Cockpit), but the company became Marlow-Hunter in 2012 and the boat was renamed the Marlow-Hunter 50.

Production
The design was built by Hunter Marine in the United States starting in 2010 and remained in production in 2019.

Design
The Marlow-Hunter 50 is a recreational keelboat, built predominantly of fiberglass. It has a B&R rig masthead sloop rig, a raked stem, an aft cockpit, a walk-through reverse transom with a swimming platform and folding ladder, an internally mounted spade-type rudder controlled by dual wheels and a fixed fin keel or wing keel. The fin keel version it displaces  and carries  of ballast, while the wing keel version displaces  and carries  of ballast.

Standard equipment includes a mast furling mainsail, mainsheet traveler on a stainless steel arch. Options include a single self-tacking jib or a self-tacking staysail with overlapping jib in a cutter rig. There are two window arrangements, an earlier one with five individual side ports and a later one with five ports in a sweeping arch.

Operational history
In a 2011 review, Cruising World writer Herb McCormick noted the large range of options that allow for a high degree of customization of the boat to customer's desires. "For instance, there are shoal-draft and deep-draft keel and ballast choices (5 feet 6 inches and 12,544 pounds or 7 feet and 11,216 pounds, respectively); standard or tall rigs (63 feet 4 inches and 68 feet 6 inches, both measured from the waterline); regular or more robust Yanmar diesels (75 horsepower or 110 horsepower), and even two different ways of approaching the headsails and foretriangle configuration (a single self-tacking jib or a self-tacking staysail with an overlapping jib). Regarding the latter, of course, either headsail arrangement is paired with Hunter’s “backstayless” B&R rig, a mainsheet traveler arch, and a battened, full-roach mainsail. For the Hunter Design Team, some things are too iconic to mess with."

upon the design's introduction, a brief Sail magazine staff report noted, "Below decks excellent use has been made of the hull's considerable volume, with all the deft touches Hunter owners have come to expect."

See also
List of sailing boat types

Related development
Marlow-Hunter 50 Center Cockpit

Similar sailboats
C&C 50
Hunter HC 50
Marlow-Hunter 47

References

External links

Keelboats
2010s sailboat type designs
Sailing yachts
Sailboat type designs by Hunter Design Team
Sailboat types built by Hunter Marine